The Connecticut Lyric Opera, founded in 2003 by a group of professional musicians and opera-lovers and based in New London, Connecticut, is now the only full-season opera company in Southeastern Connecticut.

External links
 official

Musical groups established in 2003
American opera companies
Music of Connecticut
New London, Connecticut
Performing arts in Connecticut
2003 establishments in Connecticut